Connaught Road is a major thoroughfare on the north shore of Hong Kong Island, Hong Kong. It links Shing Sai Road in Kennedy Town to the west and Harcourt Road in Admiralty to the east.

Location

The road consists of two adjoining sections, namely Connaught Road Central and Connaught Road West.

Connaught Road Central runs the length of Central, parallel to the north shore. It runs from approximately Admiralty in the east, where it connects Harcourt Road at the junction with Murray Road. The road ends west at On Tai Street, where it becomes Connaught Road West.

Connaught Road West runs towards the Kennedy Town and Pok Fu Lam areas in the west. For most of the stretch, Connaught Road West runs beneath the Connaught Road West Flyover, (Route 4). It is the main thoroughfare to the entrance of the Western Harbour Crossing and beyond to Shek Tong Tsui, where it merges with Des Voeux Road West.

History
This road was once a waterfront promenade with boats docked against the northern side of the road. In 1889, the north shore of Victoria City was under extensive reclamation. In 1890, Prince Arthur, Duke of Connaught and Strathearn visited Hong Kong, when Francis Fleming, the then acting governor announced a new road to be constructed in front of the old "Bowring Praya" (present day Des Voeux Road). This newly constructed road was then named Connaught Road, after the prince. A statue of the Duke once also occupied the junction of Pedder Street.

Connaught Road West was lined with many piers in the past. Rice wholesalers gathered there owing to its proximity to the shore. Due to reclamation of the harbour, the entire length of Connaught Road has now become landlocked.

Structures along Connaught Road

Connaught Road Central
 AIG Tower
 Edinburgh Tower
 Hong Kong Club Building
 Statue Square
 Hong Kong City Hall
 Mandarin Oriental, Hong Kong
 Connaught Place
 Chater House
 Jardine House
 Central Elevated Walkway
 World-Wide House
 Exchange Square
 International Finance Centre Tower One
 Wing On House
 Hang Seng Bank Headquarters Building
 Shun Tak Centre

Connaught Road West

Sun Yat Sen Memorial Park
Witty Street Depot of the Hong Kong Tramways
Western Wholesale Food Market
Western Harbour Crossing
 Liaison Office of the Central People's Government
 
 Island Pacific Hotel

Gallery

See also

 List of streets and roads in Hong Kong
 Pedder Street

References

Roads on Hong Kong Island
Route 4 (Hong Kong)
Central and Western District, Hong Kong